The San Gorgonio Pass wind farm is a wind farm that stretches from the eastern slope of the San Gorgonio Pass, near Cabazon, to North Palm Springs, on the western end of the Coachella Valley, in Riverside County, California. Flanked by Mount San Gorgonio and the Transverse Ranges to the North, and Mount San Jacinto and the Peninsular Ranges to the South, the San Gorgonio Pass is a transitional zone from a Mediterranean climate west of the pass, to a Desert climate east of the pass. This makes the pass area one of the most consistently windy places in the United States.

Development of the wind farm began in the 1980s.  It is one of three major wind farms in California, along with those at Altamont and the Tehachapi passes.

Utilities
As of May 2022, the farm consists of 1,224 wind turbines with a total rated capacity of 652 MW. A single Southern California Edison Path 46 500 kilo-volt power line crosses the pass on the northern edge of San Jacinto Peak. This line links the Los Angeles metropolitan area with the Palo Verde Nuclear Power Plant.

History and governance
Drew R. Oliver, president of the Oliver Electric Power Corporation, was the earliest to promote the idea of generating electricity from wind in the San Gorgonio Pass area. In 1926 Oliver, in collaboration with electrician W. Sperry Knighton, built a wind turbine near Whitewater.  The original device used a generator Oliver had salvaged from an old roller coaster at Seal Beach, California.  Oliver and Sperry fitted the generator with aluminum propellers, and placed a large funnel on the front to concentrate the wind's power.  They set the entire device on a circular rail that allowed it to be pivoted to face prevailing winds.  The powerful wind quickly burned out the 25,000 watt unit, but a larger unit was obtained from the Pacific Electric substation in Los Angeles.  After the two worked out other mechanical issues, Oliver set out to raise funds to expand the enterprise, with the vision of powering all of nearby Palm Springs. Oliver incorporated the Oliver Electric Power Corporation in Reno, Nevada, began selling stock in the company, but quickly ran afoul of newly enacted California Corporate Security Laws.  Oliver was jailed for a short time, then placed on two years probation, but his plans proceeded no further. The device he had built near Whitewater became a landmark and curiosity until it was taken down and sold for scrap in 1942.

Southern California Edison opened its Wind Energy Center eight miles northwest of Palm Springs in 1980 near its Devers substation, installing two wind turbine generators for testing. One of these was the SWT-3 horizontal axis wind turbine generator designed by Charles Schachle and produced by the Bendix Corporation. It featured three 82.5-foot blades mounted on a rotor standing 110 feet above the ground. The SWT-3 never achieved its rated power production due to losses in its hydraulic drive, limiting electric output to 1.1 MW. The second turbine tested at the Edison site was a 500-kilowatt vertical axis wind turbine generator produced by Alcoa. The Alcoa unit self-destructed just two weeks after installation in 1981 on the eve of the first American Wind Energy Conference in Palm Springs.

In 1982 wind energy development in the San Gorgonio Pass area was formally studied, and the results published in the San Gorgonio Wind Resource Study EIR (1982), a joint environmental document prepared for the U.S. Bureau of Land Management and Riverside County. The document assessed three scenarios for wind energy development in the area and included criteria for the development of wind energy on both a countywide basis and specifically for the San Gorgonio Pass area. Since 1982, and the approval of wind energy development in the San Gorgonio Pass, numerous wind turbines have become part of the landscape.

A 2008 proposal details an upgrade to the facilities to begin construction by September 2011. The proposed project would replace the 460 existing wind turbines with 30 new turbines in two phases. Phase 1 would remove approximately 74 non-operational turbines and install up to fifteen new 1.5 MW GE SLE wind turbines. Phase 2 would remove approximately 384 Vestas V15 65kW turbines and install an additional fifteen 1.5 MW GE SLE wind turbines. The proposed project would therefore comprise a total of 30 wind turbines, each 330 feet tall.

Further information

 In 1998 Huell Howser Productions, in association with KCET/Los Angeles, featured the windfarms in California's Gold; the 30 minute program is available on VHS. A second Howser/California's Gold program on the wind farms was produced in 2010.

See also

Bonnie Bell, California – Community resisting some wind development in the San Gorgonio Pass area
Wind power in California
Wind power in the United States
List of onshore wind farms
 The Passage – a novel by Justin Cronin which features the wind farm

References

Footnotes

Citations

Energy in Riverside County, California
Buildings and structures in Riverside County, California
Wind farms in California
San Gorgonio Pass
Coachella Valley